Vladimir Konstantinovich Mishin (born 1888; died 1942) was an association football player.

International career
Mishin played his only game for the Russian Empire on 4 May 1913 in a friendly against Sweden.

External links
  Profile

1888 births
1942 deaths
Footballers from the Russian Empire
Association football defenders